The following are lists of internationally recognized and domestically recognized LGBTQIA+ awareness periods, i.e. awareness days, weeks and months that focus on LGBTQIA+ matters.

Internationally recognized

Domestically recognized

Australia

Brazil

Canada

Chile

Ireland

Netherlands

New Zealand

United States

United Kingdom

See also

 List of LGBT events

References

External links
 Important Dates of GLBTSSS Interest, from the Gay, Lesbian, Bisexual, Transgender Student Support Services Office at Indiana University
 International LGBTQA Dates to Know at Wright State University
 Notable LGBT2Q+ Awareness Dates, at Queer Events
 Notable LGBT Awareness Dates and Events, at Disabled World

LGBT
Awareness periods